Valdovecaria umbratella is a species of snout moth in the genus Valdovecaria. It was described by Treitschke in 1832. It is found in France, Croatia, Turkey and on Sicily.

References

Moths described in 1832
Anerastiini
Moths of Europe